Park Royal West Halt was a railway station in Park Royal, London. It was opened on 20 June 1932 and closed on 15 June 1947 in advance of the opening of the extension of the London Underground's Central Line from North Acton to Greenford. The station was replaced by Hanger Lane to the north-west.

References

Former Great Western Railway stations
Disused railway stations in the London Borough of Ealing
Park Royal
Railway stations in Great Britain opened in 1932
Railway stations in Great Britain closed in 1947